Roman Catholic Diocese of Chersonesus may refer to the following ecclesiastical jurisdictions with sees (once) called Chersonesus :

 the Latin Roman Catholic Archdiocese of Chersonesus in Zechia, on the Crimea, now titular
 the Latin Roman Catholic Diocese of Chersonesus in Creta (formerly Chiron), Greece, now titular
 the Latin Episcopal See of Chersonesus in Europa, in the Roman Heraclea province, now Turkey, now titular